Kyle Patrick Clinton (born November 9, 1987) is an American soccer player who most recently played for Tampa Bay Rowdies.

Career
Clinton spent his college career at Francis Marion University and also played in the USL Premier Development League for Mississippi Brilla and GPS Portland Phoenix.  On March 27, 2013, Clinton signed a two-year contract with NASL club Tampa Bay Rowdies.  He made his debut on April 6, coming on as a late sub in a 0–0 draw with Carolina RailHawks.

Personal life
His father, Kevin Clinton, played goalie for the original Tampa Bay Rowdies in the old NASL, and later with them in the American Soccer League.

External links
 Tampa Bay Rowdies bio
 Francis Marion Patriots bio

1987 births
Living people
American soccer players
Mississippi Brilla players
GPS Portland Phoenix players
Tampa Bay Rowdies players
Association football midfielders
Francis Marion Patriots men's soccer players
Soccer players from Florida
USL League Two players
North American Soccer League players